Yvan Lachaud (born March 4, 1954 in Nîmes, Gard) is a member of the National Assembly of France.  He represents the Gard department,  and is a member of the New Centre.

In 2019, Lachaud publicly declared his support for incumbent President Emmanuel Macron.

References

1954 births
Living people
People from Nîmes
Politicians from Occitania (administrative region)
Union for French Democracy politicians
The Centrists politicians
Union of Democrats and Independents politicians
Deputies of the 12th National Assembly of the French Fifth Republic
Deputies of the 13th National Assembly of the French Fifth Republic